"Only If I" is the sixth single of the female Belgian dance singer Kate Ryan and was released in 2003 in Belgium. It was taken from her second studio album Stronger. It peaked #16 and was less successful there than the three former singles.

After the international success in 2002 and 2003 with the singles "Désenchantée" (#9 in European Top 200) and "Libertine" (#26) (originally by Mylène Farmer), "Only If I" only peaked #74 in the European Top 200.

Track listing
 CD Single
"Only If I" (Radio edit) - 3:11
"Only If I" (Extended version) - 5:35
"Only If I" (Peter Luts remix) - 7:37
"Hurry Up" - 3:17
 12" Single
"Only If I" (Extended version) - 5:35
"Only If I" (Peter Luts remix) - 7:37
 US Maxi Single
"Only If I" (Radio edit) - 3:11
"Only If I" (Extended version) - 5:35
"Only If I" (Hiver & Hammer Remix Edit) - 3:48
"Only If I" (Hiver & Hammer Remix) - 7:23
"Only If I" (Alex Megane Remix) - 3:55
"Only If I" (Alex Megane Extended) - 6:07
"Only If I" (Peter Luts remix) - 7:37

Chart performances
In Belgium (Flanders), the single started at #34, before reaching #16, its peak position. Then it dropped slowly, staying only three weeks in the top 20 and 11 on the whole chart (top 50).

Other chart runnings were also rather disappointing.

References

Kate Ryan songs
2004 singles
Songs written by Jeanette Olsson
Songs written by Niklas Bergwall
2004 songs
Songs written by Niclas Kings
EMI Records singles